Steve Lopes is an Australian figurative artist. He has exhibited in 40 solo shows across Australia, London and Hong Kong. His work is collected in the National Gallery of Australia, Federal Parliament House Art Collection Canberra, State Library of NSW, Bundanon Collection, Gallipoli Memorial Club, Time Warner Collection New York, Rolls-Royce London and public galleries and private collections around the world.

Early life 
Lopes studied at the University of New South Wales, Sydney, attaining a Bachelor of Arts (Fine Arts) in 1991. He studied and worked in London, and at the Art Students League, New York.

Career 
He has held painting residencies including Red Gate Gallery in Beijing; Bundanon Trust Studios, New South Wales; Your Friend the Enemy painting project in Gallipoli; Salient, Contemporary Artists at the Western Front; and Yellow Mountain, China, and Queenstown, New Zealand, through The Nock Art Foundation.

He lives and works in New South Wales, Australia.

Awards 
Winner, The King's School Art Prize 2021
Winner, Gallipoli Art Prize 2018
Young Artist Award, Royal Institute of Oil Painters, London
Finalist, Brett Whiteley Travelling Art Scholarship; Archibald Prize "Salon des Refuses" (10 times); Kilgour Figurative Awards, Kedumba; Parliament Plein Air Prize; Doug Moran Portrait Prize (8 times)

References

External links 
 Steve Lopes
 The Gallipoli Art Club Collection https://gallipoli.com.au/art-prize/
Steve Lopes Biography Pages at Stella Downer Fine Art. https://stelladownerfineart.com.au/artists-details/steve-lopes
https://www.kings.edu.au/27th-kings-art-prize-winner/   

Australian painters
1971 births
Living people